Erik Paulsson is a Swedish billionaire businessman, the chairman of  Skistar since 1977.

In 1957, aged 17, Paulsson and his younger brother Mats founded PEAB, initially waste management, before expanding into construction in 1970.

PEAB had 2014 revenue of over $5 billion, and employed more than 14,000 people.

He is married with four children, and lives in Båstad, Sweden.

References

Living people
Swedish billionaires
Swedish businesspeople
Year of birth missing (living people)